Ulrich I, Duke of Brno (11th century – 5 January 1113) was the Duke of Moravia for twenty one years - between 1092 and 1113. He was the first son and successor of Conrad I, Duke of Bohemia (died 1092) and Wirpirk of Tengling. He did not succeed as half ruler of Moravia (diarch), for all half of Moravia (the west one) as his father Conrad I, but Brno was divided into two parts: Brno and Znojmo and Ulrich was co-ruler in this part with his brother Luitpold of Znojmo. Both brothers together established a benedictine cloister and its St. Procopius Basilica in Třebíč and prepared as mausoleum for Brno-Znojmo branch House of Přemyslid.

He had long ruled over Moravia (as diarch in Brno) for 21 years, once interrupted by illegitimate regency: (1099–1100 by Bretislaus II)

By his marriage to an unknown princess, he probably had two children:

Wratislaus of Brno, Duke of Brno from 1125 to 1129 and from 1130 to his death in 1146
Nadia (?),(or Nadine, original Надія, Czech Naděj)

He was succeeded legitimately as prince of Brno by his son Wratislaus of Brno.

Domestic policy 

Ulrich and Luitpold initially ruled in the Brno part (the western one) of the duchy of Moravia, until 1099 when they were evicted illegitimately by Bretislaus II. Later they enforced a return of the Brno part of the Moravian duchy - with the help of the Bavarian armed troops as well as indirect support by Emperor Henry IV (whom he visited in early February 1101 in Frankfurt), according to the principles of agnatic seniority. After they returned to the duchy of Brno, the brothers divided it into two subparts named Brno (principality) and Znojmo (principality), where they continued to reign in certain local territorial union. In 1104 they together founded a Benedictine abbey in Třebíč whose convent church of St. Procopius was intended as their own dynastic mausoleum where they were both buried.

Emperor Henry IV gave Ulrich insignia of rank and banner (vexillum) for their reign in the duchy.

All the Moravian lines of Přemysl dynasty as a whole were systematically associated with dynastic marriages with princesses of major royal and ducal dynasties, especially Árpád dynasty, Rurik dynasty, Piast dynasty, Nemanjić dynasty-senior line Vukanović and houses of bavarian monarchs, as it was the other way around (vice versa). Members of the Moravian dynasty were fully predisposed to take over the central throne (for both countries - Bohemia and Moravia) in Prague, under the principles of agnatic seniority.

Family tree

Ancestry

See also
 History of Moravia
 Margraviate of Moravia
 Otto I of Olomouc
 Lands of the Bohemian Crown
 Ducal Rotunda of the Virgin Mary and St Catherine
 Conrad II, Duke of Bohemia
 Helen of Znojmo

Citations and notes

References

Bibliography

Primary sources 
 COSMAS, (Canonicus Pragensis); Chronica Boëmorum. (Latin)
 COSMAS of Prague, (Canon of Prague),Translated by Lisa Wolverton (2009); Chronicle of the Czechs (Chronicle of Bohemias).  The Catholic university of America Press. (English)

Secondary sources 
 KRZEMIEŃSKA, Barbara; MERAHAUTOVÁ, Anežka; TŘEŠTÍK, Dušan (2000). Moravští Přemyslovci ve Znojemské rotundě. Praha: SetOut. 135 p.. . (in Czech)
 WOLVERTON, Lisa (2001). Hastening toward Prague. Philadelphia, University of Pennsylvania Press.   (English)
 REITINGER, Lukáš. Nekrologia kláštera Pegau. Pozapomenuté svědectví o Přemyslovcích (nejen) Kosmova věku. In: WIHODA, Martin; REITINGER, Lukáš (2010). Proměna středovýchodní Evropy raného a vrcholného středověku. Brno : Matice moravská, . . p. 373-374 (in Czech)
 GROSMANNOVÁ, Dagmar (2010). Medieval Coinage in Moravia. In: GALUŠKA, Luděk; MITÁČEK, Jiří; NOVOTNÁ Lea. Treasures of Moravia. Brno: Moravian Museum Press. . p. 371-374 (English)
 MOLECZ, P. (2003):Die Hanthaler-Fälschungen im Lilielnfelder Nekrolog am Beispiel der Schwestern des Heiligen Leopold. Eine Beitrag zur Barocken Wischenschaftsgeschichte und Babenbergergenealogie. MIÖG 111, p. 241-284, exact 360–365. (in German)
 SOMMER, Petr; TŘEŠTÍK, Dušan; ŽEMLIČKA, Josef, a kol. Přemyslovci. Budování českého státu. Praha : Nakladatelství Lidové noviny, 2009. 779 s. .  
 WIHODA, Martin. Morava v době knížecí 906–1197. Praha : Nakladatelství Lidové noviny, 2010. 464 s. .
 MĚCHUROVÁ, Zdeňka (2010). From the medieval history of Moravia. In: GALUŠKA, Luděk; MITÁČEK, Jiří; NOVOTNÁ Lea. Treasures of Moravia. Brno: Moravian Museum Press. . p. 107-115 (English)  
 ŽEMLIČKA, Josef (2005). Přemyslovci. Jak žili, vládli, umírali. Praha: Nakladatelství Lidové noviny, . 497 s. . (in Czech)

External links 
MORAVIA, dukes and margraves genealogy tables  
The Ducal Rotunda of the Virgin Mary and St Catherine web page  
The Ducal Rotunda in Znojmo - A virtual tour  
Moravia dukes - Ulrich of Brno part  
 

Roman Catholic monarchs
People from Brno
Přemyslid dynasty
Younger sons of dukes
1113 deaths
Year of birth unknown